The article lists China's province-level divisions by exports of goods. Each province's exports is listed in nominal US dollar values according to annual average exchange rates

Mainland China (2018) 
The 22 provinces, 5 autonomous regions and 4 direct-administered municipalities of Mainland China by export value in 2018.

Hong Kong, Macau and Taiwan 
The 2 special administrative regions of Hong Kong and Macau and the claimed province of Taiwan by export value in the most recent year. Exports to Mainland China are included.

References 

exports
exports
Economy of China by province
Economy of China-related lists
China, exports